This is a list of museums in Umbria, Italy.

References 

Umbria